Erbil Uzel (born 15 April 1974) is a retired Turkish football defender who played a game with the Turkey national football team in 1996.

References

1974 births
Living people
Turkish footballers
Kırklarelispor footballers
Beylerbeyi S.K. footballers
Aydınspor footballers
Karşıyaka S.K. footballers
Sarıyer S.K. footballers
Adanaspor footballers
Association football defenders
Turkey international footballers
Turkish football managers
Sarıyer S.K. managers